Malda or English Bazar is a city in the Indian state of West Bengal. It is the sixth largest city (urban agglomeration) in West Bengal. It is the headquarters of the Malda district as well as of the Malda division of West Bengal. It consists of two municipalities, viz. English Bazar Municipality and Old Malda Municipality, under Malda Metropolitan Area. The city is located on the banks of the Mahananda River. Malda was an undeveloped city which was enlarging from 1925 to 1930. The city is growing rapidly nowadays with its population inching towards half a million.

Etymology
The name English Bazar is derived from Angrezābād ("English-town"), applied in the 17th century to the surroundings of the English factory.

Geography

Location
It has an average elevation of 17 metres (56 feet). It is situated on both the western and eastern banks of the river Mahananda.

Climate

Like the most other places in West Bengal, the weather of Malda is usually extremely humid and tropical. Temperatures can reach as high as  during the day in May and June and fall as low as  overnight in December and January.

The driest month is December.

Demographics

 2011 census, Malda metropolitan city had a total population of 324,237.

 2011 census, English Bazar municipality had a population of 216,083. The municipality had a sex ratio of 877 females per 1,000 males and 14.9% of the population were under six years old. Effective literacy was 84.69%; male literacy was 85.44% and female literacy was 83.86%.

 India census, Old Malda Municipality had a population of 62,944. Males constitute 52% of the population and females 48%. Old Malda has an average literacy rate of 61%, higher than the national average of 59.5%: male literacy is 67%, and female literacy is 54%. In Old Malda, 15% of the population is under 6 years of age.

Religion
As of 2011 census, the majority of the population of the English Bazar municipality were Hindus with 86.95% adherents, followed by 11.02% Muslims and small populations of Sikhs and Christians.

Civic administration
There are two municipalities in Malda, i.e. the English Bazar Municipality and the Old Malda Municipality.

The municipality of English Bazar is divided into 29 wards. The Trinamool Congress (with 25 councillors) holds the power in this municipality (as of 2022).

The municipality of Old Malda is divided into 20 wards.

Transport

Road 

 crosses through the city. The Gour Kanya Bus Terminus serves as the bus depot for both private buses and government bus service operated by the North Bengal State Transport Corporation (NBSTC).

Rail 

There are four railway stations which serves the metropolitan city.  Malda Town railway station serves the English Bazar area; Old Malda Junction serves the Old Malda area; Malda Court serves Mangalbari and Naldubi area, and Gour Malda serves Mahadipur and Gauḍa (Gour) area.

Air
Malda Airport (IATA: LDA, ICAO: VEMH) was closed in 1972 due to the Bangladesh War. Before that there were direct daily flights from Malda to Kolkata, Delhi, and Guwahati. In 2014, direct helicopter services were started between Malda and Kolkata, by the government of West Bengal. As of 2017, the airport is under construction and the flight service will start very soon.

Education

University 
 University of Gour Banga

Colleges
General degree colleges
 Malda College
 Gour Mahavidyalaya
 Malda Women's College

Engineering colleges
 Ghani Khan Choudhury Institute of Engineering & Technology (GKCIET)
 IMPS College of Engineering and Technology 

Polytechnic colleges
 Malda Polytechnic

Medical colleges
 Malda Medical College and Hospital

Schools
Some of the notable high schools of the city include
Kendriya Vidyalaya Malda (Co-education)
Boys' high schools

 A. C. Institution
 Lalit Mohan Shyam Mohini High School
 Malda Town High School
 Malda Zilla School
 Ramakrishna Mission Vivekananda Vidyamandir

Girls' high schools
 Barlow Girls' High School

Rail schools
 Malda Railway High School

English medium schools
 Usha Martin School, Malda

Notable people

 Subhamita Banerjee – Bengali singer
 Subhash Bhowmick – Indian international football player and manager
 Sandip Chakrabarti – scientist
 A. B. A. Ghani Khan Choudhury – politician and leader of the Indian National Congress
 Krishnendu Narayan Choudhury – politician
 Nihar Ranjan Ghosh – politician
 Mausam Noor – politician
 Sukhendu Sekhar Roy – politician
 Uma Roy – politician
 Krishna Jiban Sanyal – freedom fighter
 Benoy Kumar Sarkar – Indian social scientist, professor and nationalist
 Santi Gopal Sen – freedom fighter and social reformer

See also
 English Bazar (community development block)
 Malda Museum
 List of cities in West Bengal
 List of metropolitan area in West Bengal

References

Further reading
 Chakrabarti D.K. (1992). Notes on the archaeology of Maldaha and West Dinajpur districts, West Bengal. South Asian Studies, 9:pp. 123–135

External links
 Malda District - Home

Cities and towns in Malda district
 
Cities in West Bengal